VRR (a Vector-based gRaphic editoR) is a free and open-source vector graphics editor application designed especially for creating illustrations of mathematical articles.

VRR has a simple but powerful operation set: creating, manipulating and transforming basic graphic primitives, which are points, segments, rational Bézier curves, elliptic arcs etc. All objects can be determined not only by absolute coordinates, but also by geometric dependencies on other objects – intersections, significant points, other curves etc. When an object is changed, the dependent objects are recalculated automatically. This enables you to modify the image easily without breaking the lines visually tied together.

VRR has a sophisticated system for working with text. In addition to common text objects, it allows you to create text objects typeset by TeX and make them part of your image. This is especially useful for including math expressions into the picture.

The editor is able to import from and export to files in common data formats (export to PDF, PS, EPS and SVG, import from IPE5 and SVG).

VRR runs on Linux and uses a graphical user interface based on the X Window System and GTK.

The VRR project was started as a student project at Faculty of Maths and Physics, Charles University, Prague, Czech Republic. Since September 2005 it is being developed in the authors' free time. The last available release (as of May 2009) is 9.0.4, published in March 2007.

External links 
VRR homepage

Free vector graphics editors